Wakefield is a census-designated place in Fairfax County, Virginia, United States. The population as of the 2010 census was 11,275. The current Wakefield area was built in the 1950-60's.

Geography
Bounded by the Capital Beltway, Little River Turnpike, Guinea Road and Braddock Road, the CDP draws much of its identity from Wakefield Chapel, an 1899-built Methodist church that is now owned by the county Park Authority and still available as a chapel. Wakefield Chapel Road bisects the CDP, and Wakefield Park Recreation Center and several subdivisions bear the Wakefield name. Northern Virginia Community College's Annandale Campus is also here, as is the historic Oak Hill Mansion.

Neighboring communities are Mantua to the northwest, Woodburn to the north, Annandale to the east, North Springfield to the southeast, Ravensworth and Kings Park to the south, Burke to the southwest, and Long Branch to the west. Its borders are formed by Guinea Road to the west, Braddock Road to the south, Interstate 495 to the east, and Little River Turnpike to the north.

Education
Fairfax County Public Schools operates area public schools. Public schools within the CDP include:
 Canterbury Woods Elementary School (Annandale postal address)
Wakefield Forest Elementary School

Holy Spirit School, of the Roman Catholic Diocese of Arlington, is in Wakefield CDP. It has an Annandale postal address.

Northern Virginia Community College has the Annandale Campus within the CDP limits.

References

Census-designated places in Fairfax County, Virginia
Washington metropolitan area
Census-designated places in Virginia